Gardiner may refer to:

Places

Settlements
Canada
 Gardiner, Ontario

United States
 Gardiner, Maine
 Gardiner, Montana
 Gardiner (town), New York
 Gardiner (CDP), New York
 Gardiner, Oregon
 Gardiner, Washington
 West Gardiner, Maine

Buildings and landmarks
Gardiner Museum, a ceramics museum in Toronto

Geographical features
Antarctica
 Gardiner Ridge, Ames Range, Marie Byrd Land

Australia
 Gardiner railway station, Melbourne, Victoria

Canada
 Gardiner Dam in Saskatchewan
 Gardiner Expressway in Toronto
 Gardiner Island (Nunavut), uninhabited arctic island in Nunavut

United States
 Gardiners Bay in New York State
 Gardiners Island in Gardiners Bay
 Gardiner River (also known as the Gardner River) in Yellowstone National Park, United States

People
 Lord Gardiner (disambiguation)
 Baron Gardiner

Stagenames
 Gardiner Sisters

People with Gardiner as a surname
See Gardiner (surname)

People with Gardiner as a first name
 Gardiner Greene (1753–1832), American cotton planter and merchant
 Gardiner Greene Hubbard (1822–1897), first president of the National Geographic Society

Ships
 , a British frigate in commission in the Royal Navy from 1943 to 1945

Linguistics
 Gardiner's sign list, a standard method for categorizing ancient Egyptian hieroglyphics

See also
 
 
 Gardener (disambiguation)
 Gardner (disambiguation)
 Justice Gardiner (disambiguation)